Venom is an English heavy metal band from Newcastle upon Tyne. Formed in 1979, the group originally featured drummer Anthony Bray, rhythm guitarist Conrad Lant, lead guitarist Jeffrey Dunn, vocalist Clive Archer and bassist Alan Winston, although Winston left early on and Lant switched to bass. Each band member soon adopted a stage name for use in Venom – Bray as "Abaddon", Lant as "Cronos", Dunn as "Mantas" and Archer as "Christus". Archer was credited as "Jesus Christ" on the band's first demo tape Demon, released in 1980. Shortly after the demo's release, the decision was made to dismiss the vocalist and continue Venom as a three-piece, as Cronos had begun taking over the role. The band's lineup remained stable for the release of four studio albums between 1981 and 1985, before Mantas left in 1986.

For 1987's Calm Before the Storm, Abaddon and Cronos brought in guitarists Mike Hickey and Jim Clare. The following year, however, the frontman decided to leave Venom and form his own eponymous band, with both new members joining him in the group's initial lineup. Cronos was replaced by former Atomkraft frontman Tony "Demolition Man" Dolan early the following year, as Mantas returned and Al Barnes was added on rhythm guitar. After the release of Prime Evil, Tear Your Soul Apart and Temples of Ice, Barnes left Venom; he was replaced by Steve "War Maniac" White, who joined alongside keyboardist Dave "VXS" Young for 1992's The Waste Lands. Dolan, Mantas and Abaddon continued performing as a trio, before Cronos returned in time for a headlining show at Holland's Waldrock Festival on 24 June 1995.

Abaddon, the only remaining constant member of Venom, left the group in 1999 and was replaced by Cronos' brother Anthony "Antton" Lant. In February 2002, Venom was put on hiatus after Cronos was injured in a climbing accident. The group returned in 2004, with Hickey (now under the name "Mykvs") returning to replace the departed Mantas. Mykvs was later replaced by Stuart "La Rage" Dixon in early 2007. Antton then left to focus on his other band Def-Con-One in 2009, with Danny "Dante" Needham taking his place a month later.

Members

Current

Former

Timeline

Lineups

References

External links
Venom official website

Venom